The Rugby Football League Championship Third Division was founded in 1991 and was the third tier of professional rugby league in the UK until 1998.

History
The RFL Championship Third Division was founded in 1991 to make the top two divisions more competitive. The competition ran for two seasons until it was scrapped in 1993. The third division was resurrected in 1995 and ran for another three seasons although there was no promotion in 1995-96. In 1999 the Second and Third Divisions were merged to create the Northern Ford Premiership, the third division was recreated again in 2003.

In 2003 rugby league beneath Super League were completely re-organised into the Rugby League National Leagues. The Third Division was renamed National League Two.

Results

In 1993, Chorley Borough, Blackpool Gladiators and Nottingham City were relegated to the National Conference League.

Winners

§ Denotes club now defunct

See also

 Rugby Football League Championship
 Rugby Football League Championship Second Division
 Rugby League Championships

References

External links

Rugby league competitions in the United Kingdom
Rugby Football League
Rugby Football League Championship